The 2011 CWHL Draft was held on July 21, 2011 in Mississauga. The Montreal Stars had the first pick overall and selected Meghan Agosta  from Mercyhurst College.

Top 50 picks

Draft picks by team

Alberta

Boston

Brampton

Burlington

Montreal

Toronto

Transactions

References

Draft
Canadian Women's Hockey League